Sionna may refer to:
 Sionna, Masovian Voivodeship, a Polish town
 Shannon (given name), the Irish spelling of Shannon

See also 
 Shannon (disambiguation)
 Siona (disambiguation)
 Sion (disambiguation)